Raymond Bloomer (December 9, 1886 – November 1, 1948), was an American actor. He appeared in 22 films between 1913 and 1927.

Filmography

External links

American male film actors
American male silent film actors
Male actors from New York (state)
1886 births
1948 deaths
20th-century American male actors